John Pearson (born 18 October 1946) is an English former professional footballer who played as a winger in the Football League for York City, in non-League football for Horwich Railway Mechanics Institute, and was on the books of Manchester United without making a league appearance. He was capped by England schools.

References

1946 births
Living people
Footballers from Wigan
English footballers
England schools international footballers
Association football midfielders
Manchester United F.C. players
York City F.C. players
Leigh Genesis F.C. players
English Football League players